William G. Moseley is an American academic. He is the DeWitt Wallace Professor of Geography, and director of the Food, Agriculture & Society Program at Macalester College in Saint Paul, Minnesota. His research interests include tropical agriculture, food security, and development policy. He is the author of over 100 peer-reviewed articles, as well as eight books. In 2013 he won the Media Award, and in 2016 the Kwadwo Konadu-Agyemang Distinguished Africa Scholar Award, both from the American Association of Geographers. He serves on the International Steering Committee of the High Level Panel of Experts on Food Security and Nutrition of the UN Committee on World Food Security (CFS).

Background and early years
Moseley attended Carleton College (B.A.History, 1987), the University of Michigan (M.S. and M.P.P., 1993), and the University of Georgia (PhD, 2001). Before becoming an academic, Moseley was in the US Peace Corps in Mali from 1987 to 1989. He also worked for Save the Children UK, the World Bank Environment Department, and the US Agency for International Development.

Scholarship and publications
Moseley is a development and human-environment geographer with particular expertise in political ecology, tropical agriculture, environment and development policy, livelihood security, and West Africa and Southern Africa. He has published over 100 peer-reviewed journal articles and book chapters, as well as numerous newspaper op-eds.  He writes a regular column for Al Jazeera, and previously was an associate editor of Food Policy and editor of the African Geographical Review.

Books
Moseley, W.G., M. Schnurr and R. Bezner Kerr. 2016. Africa’s Green Revolution: Critical Perspectives on New Agricultural Technologies and Systems. Oxford, UK: Taylor & Francis.

McCusker, B., W.G. Moseley and M. Ramutsindela. 2015. Land Reform in South Africa: An Uneven Transformation. Lanham, MD: Rowman and Littlefield Publishers, Inc.

Fouberg, E. and W.G. Moseley. 2015. Understanding  World Regional Geography. Hoboken, NJ: Wiley/Blackwell.

Moseley, W.G., E. Perramond and H. Hapke and P. Laris. 2013. An Introduction to Human-Environment Geography: Local Dynamics and Global Processes. Hoboken, NJ: Wiley/Blackwell..

Moseley, W.G. and L.C. Gray (eds). 2008. Hanging by a Thread: Cotton, Globalization and Poverty in Africa. Athens, OH: Ohio University Press and Nordic Africa Press..

Moseley, W.G., D. Lanegran and K. Pandit (eds). 2007. The Introductory Reader in Human Geography: Contemporary Debates and Classic Writings. Malden, MA: Blackwell Press..

Moseley, W.G. (ed.) 2004, 2006, 2008, 2011. Taking Sides: Clashing Views on African Issues. 1st, 2nd, 3rd & 4th Editions. Dubuque, IA: McGraw-Hill. (and ).

Moseley, W.G. and B.I. Logan. (eds.) 2004. African Environment and Development: Rhetoric, Programs, Realities. King’s SOAS Studies in Development Geography.  Aldershot, UK: Ashgate Publishing Limited..

References

External links
 Faculty biography
 2019 Video of live public conversation with former Macalester College President Brian Rosenberg & former student Julia Morgan 
 2018 video story and interview on vimeo entitled "Faces: A Case for Academia"
 2016 video MacTalks: How to make West African peanut sauce
 2011 YouTube video on "How Does One Become a Geographer"
 Voice interview on Africafiles: The Pulse
 2012 Interview (TV) on Twin Cities Public Television re: famine in the Horn of Africa.

1965 births
Macalester College faculty
Carleton College alumni
Peace Corps people
Living people
Political ecologists
Peace Corps volunteers